Lignes Aériennes Congolaises (LAC) was the flag carrier of the Democratic Republic of the Congo. It was established in 1997 to succeed the folded Air Zaire. Halting operations in 1999, it was reactivated for a short period in 2002, only to fold operations permanently in 2003.

History
The airline was set up in 1997, and started operations the same year. It was a reorganisation of Air Zaïre.

In 1999, a contract with the Belgian carrier City Bird to wet-lease a Boeing 767-300ER was signed. Under this agreement, the airline would serve the Kinshasa–Brussels route, with the Belgian carrier codesharing the service. Although the agreement came into being  for a five-year period, it was scrapped in November the same year.

Destinations
Lignes Aériennes Congolaises (LAC) served the following destinations all through its history:

Codeshare agreements
There was a short-lived agreement between City Bird and LAC to codeshare the Kinshasa–Brussels route, operated by LAC but with City Bird aircraft. Since late 2000, LAC codeshared the Harare–Lubumbashi–Kinshasa route, actually operated by Air Zimbabwe; the same agreement enabled Air Zimbabwe to place its code on the Kinshasa–Brussels service, operated by LAC.

Fleet

Lignes Aeriennes Congolaises operated the following aircraft all throughout its history:

 ATR-42-320
 Boeing 707-320C
 Boeing 737-200C
 Boeing 767-200ER
 Douglas DC-8-50

Accidents and incidents

Accidents involving fatalities
10 October 1998: A Boeing 727-30, registration 9Q-CSG, that was due to operate a non-scheduled domestic Kindu–Kinshasa passenger service, was shot down by rebel forces near Kindu shortly after takeoff, killing all 41 occupants on board.

Non-fatal hull-losses
1 January 1999: A Boeing 737-298C, tail number 9Q-CNK, experienced an emergency landing at Kilimanjaro Airport due to an engine failure; the aircraft was ferried to N'djili Airport in March that year, and it has apparently been out of service since then.

See also

Transport in the Democratic Republic of the Congo

References

Defunct airlines of the Democratic Republic of the Congo
Airlines disestablished in 2008
Companies based in Kinshasa